The STREIT Group Spartan is an armoured personnel carrier designed and built by STREIT Group; it is also license produced by KrAZ (Kremenchuk Automobile Plant) in Kremenchuk, Ukraine.

The Spartan can be used in a wide variety of applications, including military and police missions. Its welded steel body is mounted on the chassis of a Ford F550.  It is able to withstand ballistic assaults and protect against grenade and land mine blasts.

Variants

KrAZ-Spartan  
 
 
The Ukrainian truck maker AutoKraz manufactures the Spartan under license and the vehicle was first delivered to the military in 2014. According to manufacture, KrAZ Spartan armored vehicle is used for carrying personnel in highly dangerous areas. Spartan is designed to resist ballistic threats from any angle. It offers CEN Level BR6 protection. The vehicle’s hull is designed to resist multiple 7.62×51mm NATO (flat nose, pointed bullet, lead soft core) assault rifle rounds from any angle. The bottom of the vehicle can withstand the blast of two DM51 high-explosive fragmentation hand grenades.  Its roof hatch is designed to support a pivoting turret with or without a machine gun. A remote controlled weapon station (RWS) is also installable as per customer requirement that combines a machine gun and a quartet of RK-3 Corsar anti-tank missiles. Specifications:
Configuration: 4х4
Truck gross weight: 8,800 kg
Engine: 6.7L diesel 
Power: 300 hp 
Max speed: 110 km/h
Gear box: automatic, 6-speed
Seating capacity: 2 crew members + 6 troops
Tyres: 335/70R20; 335/80R20 (RunFlat)

KrAZ-Spartan Self-Driving  Armoured Vehicle 
KrAZ-Spartam Self-Driving Armoured Vehicle is unmanned ground vehicle (UGV) version of KrAZ-Spartan. It was unveiled during the 2016 Arms and Security exhibition in Kyiv. The vehicle could be operated by a tablet, a smart glove or an operator control station. It uses WiFi / Wimax wireless networks to communicate with a range from 10 km to 50 km. It can transport ammunition, food, fuel and medicines to the combat zone. It also has ability to carry wounded troops to hospitals.

Operators

 
 Argentine National Gendarmerie
 
 Tripoli Protection Force - Approximately 79 Spartan vehicles delivered by 2014.
 
 
 Armed Forces of Ukraine – 30 KrAZ Spartans were given to Ukrainian Ground Forces in 2014.
 National Guard of Ukraine – In early August 2014, the Ministry of the Interior of Ukraine ordered 21 KrAZ Spartans for the National Guard of Ukraine. After the military parade dedicated to the 23rd Independence Day of Ukraine (August 24, 2014), they were sent into combat in Eastern Ukraine.

References

External links
 Official specifications

Military vehicles of Canada
All-wheel-drive vehicles
Military vehicles of Ukraine
KrAZ vehicles
Military vehicles introduced in the 2010s